Iota-carrageenase is an enzyme with systematic name iota-carrageenan 4-beta-D-glycanohydrolase (configuration-inverting). This enzyme catalyses the following chemical reaction

 Endohydrolysis of (1->4)-beta-D-linkages between D-galactose 4-sulfate and 3,6-anhydro-D-galactose-2-sulfate in iota-carrageenans

The main products of hydrolysis are iota-neocarratetraose sulfate and iota-neocarrahexaose sulfate.

References

External links 
 

EC 3.2.1